Guilford Township may refer to:

Places

United States
Guilford Township, Jo Daviess County, Illinois
Guilford Township, Hendricks County, Indiana
Guilford Township, Monroe County, Iowa
Guilford Township, Medina County, Ohio
Guilford Township, Franklin County, Pennsylvania